People with the given name Preston include:

Preston Bassett (1892–1992), American inventor and engineer
Preston Blair (1908–1995), American animator
Preston J. Bradshaw (1884–1952), American architect
Preston Brooks (1819–1857), American politician
Preston Brown (disambiguation), multiple people
Preston M. Burch (1884–1978), American racehorse trainer
Preston Burpo (born 1972), American soccer player
Preston Bynum (1939-2018), American politician and businessman
Preston Campbell (born 1977), Australian rugby league footballer
Preston W. Campbell (1874–1954), American lawyer
Preston Carpenter (1934–2011), American football player
Preston Carrington (born 1949), American athlete
Preston C. Clayton (1903–1996), justice of the Supreme Court of Alabama
Preston Cloud (1912–1991), American paleontologist and geologist
Preston Scott Cohen, American architect
Preston Corderman (1904–1998), American army officer
Preston Covey, American philosopher
Preston Daniels, American politician and first African-American mayor of Des Moines, Iowa
Preston Davie (1881–1967), American lawyer and colonel
Preston Davis (American football) (born 1962), American football player
Preston Davis (politician) (1907–1990), American politician
Preston Delano (c.1886–1961), American businessman
Preston Dennard (born 1955), American football player
Preston Dickinson (1889–1930), American artist
Preston Doerflinger (born 1973), American businessman and politician
Preston Edwards (born 1989), English footballer
Preston Elliott (1875–1939), Canadian farmer and politician
Preston Epps (born 1931), American musician
Preston Estep, American biologist
Preston Fleet (1934–1995), American businessman
Preston Foster (1900–1970), American actor
Preston Glass (born 1960}, American songwriter and producer
Preston Gothard (born 1962), American football player
Preston Griffall (born 1984), American luger
Preston Gómez (1923–2009), Cuban-born baseball player
Preston Hanna (born 1954), American baseball player
Preston Hanson (1921–2008), American actor
Preston Haskell (born 1938), American businessman
Preston Henn (born 1931), American entrepreneur
Preston Heyman, British drummer
Preston Holder (1907–1980), American archaeologist and photographer
Preston Jackson (1902–1983), American musician
Preston Jones (disambiguation), multiple people
Preston Keat (born 1966), American political scientist
Preston King (disambiguation) (1806–1865), American politician
Preston Knowles (born 1989), American basketball player
Preston Lacy (born 1969), American actor
Preston Lea (1841–1916), American businessman and politician
Preston Leslie (1819–1907), American politician
Preston Lockwood (1912–1996), English actor
Preston Love (1921–2004), American jazz musician
Preston McAfee (born 1956), American economist
Preston McGann, American football player
Preston Manning (born 1942), Canadian politician
Preston Martin (1923–2007), American banker
Preston D. Miller, periodontist
Preston Mitchell, American football coach
Preston Mommsen (born 1987), South African born Scottish cricketer
Preston Nash, American musician
Preston Nibley (1884–1966), American religious leader
Preston Nichols (born 1946), American author
Preston Ware Orem (1865–1938), American composer, pianist and writer
Preston Parker (born 1987), American football player
Preston Parks, American politician
Preston Parsons (born 1979), American football player
Preston Pearson (born 1945), American football player
Preston E. Peden (1914–1985), American politician
Preston B. Plumb (1837–1891), American politician
Preston Powers (1842–1904), American sculptor, painter and teacher
Preston Quick (born 1978), American squash player
Preston Reed (born 1955), American guitarist
Preston Richards(born 1881), American lawyer
Preston Ridd (born 1953), New Zealand darts player
Preston Ridlehuber (born 1943), American football player
Preston Ritter (born 1949), musician
Preston Shumpert (born 1979), American-Turkish basketball player
Preston Singletary (born 1963), American glass artist
Preston Smith (disambiguation), multiple people
Preston Strother (born 1999), American actor
Preston Sturges (1898–1959), American writer and director
Preston Stutzman, American film producer and actor
Preston Robert Tisch (1926–2005), American businessman
Preston Tucker (1903–1956), American automobile designer and entrepreneur
Preston Valien (1914-1995), African-American sociologist
Preston Ward (born 1927), American baseball player
Preston Ware (1821–1890), American chess player
Preston Washington (1948–2003), American religious leader
Preston Watson (1880–1915), Scottish aviator
Preston A. Whitmore II, American screenwriter, producer and director
Preston Wilson (born 1974), American baseball player
Preston Williams (born 1997), American football player
Preston Young (born 1954), Canadian football player
Preston Zimmerman (born 1988), American soccer player

See also
List of people with surname Preston

Preston